Bless the Beasts and Children is a 1971 film adaptation of the novel of the same name written by Glendon Swarthout. It was directed by Stanley Kramer and stars Bill Mumy and Barry Robins.

Plot

The central characters in Bless the Beasts and Children are six adolescent boys, whose preoccupied parents send them off to the Arizona Box Canyon Boys Camp for the summer. John Cotton (Barry Robins) leads this bunch of "misfits" who are all, to varying degrees, emotionally or psychologically disturbed.  Cotton's group, composed of rejects and outcasts from the other cabins, is known as the "Bedwetters" and the boys are constantly demeaned and ridiculed, which inevitably crushes what little self-esteem they might otherwise have possessed in the first place.

Cotton, through trial and tribulation, becomes the leader of this tight-knit group, and he sets out to mold his followers into a unit that commands respect rather than derision. His is obviously a formidable task in view of the fragile psychological state of the small group, which includes two warring dysfunctional brothers who are known as "Lally 1" and "Lally 2". Lally 1 reacts to threats against his emotional security by throwing violent temper tantrums, often directed at his younger brother Lally 2, who in the face of these attacks plunges himself into a fantasy world that is filled with tiny creatures he calls "Ooms", and seeks solace in the scorched foam rubber pillow he always carries.

Lawrence Teft III (Billy Mumy) is shown in the film as quiet and sullen, but whenever he is confronted with authority, he turns rebellious. Before he came to camp, one of Teft's favorite adventures had been stealing cars, but because of the "connections" of his father, Lawrence Teft Jr., he was never arrested for any of his offenses. Hoping that he will learn some self-discipline which will make him worthy of attending Exeter or Dartmouth, his parents enroll him in the camp.

Cotton's group also includes Sammy Shecker, an overweight, paranoid Jewish boy, whose father is a successful comedian who trades upon the Jewish stereotype. Sometimes to the annoyance of the other boys, Sammy mimics his father's routines, he compulsively bites his nails, and he is loud, nervous, and obnoxious. The designation "Bedwetters" applies especially well to Gerald Goodenow, the sixth member of the group, who often wets the bed at night – a behavior that had resulted in his having been ejected from two cabins before Cotton takes him in tow. Bedwetting, however, seems to be the least of Gerald's problems, as he suffers from a phobic reaction to school, which results in several unsuccessful sessions with a psychiatrist. Goodenow is also handicapped by a heavy-handed stepfather who is determined to make a man out of him, by physical force if necessary.

Kramer and his screenwriter Mac Benoff decided to compromise Swarthout's time sequence by having the entire film set in the present with flashbacks into the past of all the boys, to explicate their presence at the camp. Whereas Swarthout's novel – thematically powerful though it is – is episodic and difficult for some sixth-graders to follow, the Kramer film flows almost faultlessly to its tragic conclusion. The plight of the American buffalo and any other endangered species is at the center of the film's focus. Almost predictably, the dysfunctional group, under Cotton's guidance, set out to free a large herd of the bison after they witness their perverted macho camp counselor, "Wheaties", shooting the animals in a festive (and deeply disturbing) western lottery, which is given validation as a proper method to thin out the large numbers by eliminating the "weak" or "sick" buffalo. The buffalo are not the only targets of this destructive urge, as the Bedwetters – similarly – have also been "tamed", "penned" and crushed in spirit. As a result of their parents' neglect or abuse, they have all been reduced to psychological misfits. Ridiculed and rejected by the other boys in the camp, they are forced to cling even more strongly to their deviant behavior. The boys' pilgrimage to free the buffalo is also an allegorical search for their own freedom.

Cotton perceives that success will free the boys of psychological crutches and allow each to stand alone in defense of self. Cotton sacrifices his life not only for the buffalo but for the boys he has led to this one miraculous triumph. The implication at the end of the film is that the remaining boys are no longer "dings" or "weirdos", as they have all gained a sense of pride in their abilities and have saved themselves, as well as the buffalo, from extinction. The title of the film (and novel) exemplifies the dual yet unified nature of the theme. Both beasts and children need to be free to roam, to develop and to discover, but the freedom that is given to the buffalo at the film's conclusion is worthless because their very natures have been altered by man. Outside the fence of the preserve, the tame buffalo will never find wild plains and grasslands on which to roam and their natural habitat, along with their natural spirit, has been destroyed. The children, however, have regained their spirit and independence and eventually they will triumph over the fear instilled in them by their parents and society. But it is conspicuous that they will require the love and compassion of others.

Cast
 Bill Mumy – Lawrence Teft III
 Barry Robins – John Cotton
 Miles Chapin – Sammy Shecker
 Darel Glaser – Gerald Goodenow
 Bob Kramer – Lally 1
 Marc Vahanian – Lally 2
 Jesse White – Shecker's Father
 Ken Swofford – Wheaties
 Elaine Devry – Cotton's Mother
 David Ketchum – Camp Director (credited as Dave Ketchum)
 Bruce Glover – Hustler
 Wayne Sutherlin – Hustler
 Vanessa Brown – Goodenow's Mother
 William Bramley – Goodenow's Stepfather

Production and reception
A bidding war broke out over the film rights, which Stanley Kramer eventually won. Kramer negotiated with Columbia Pictures for the right to produce and direct the film, which made its world premiere at the Berlin Film Festival in August  1971, as the United States's entry in the international competition. Kramer later commented on Soviet reception of the film, stating that they "viewed [the film] as a preachment against Kent State and My Lai," when he had envisioned more of a statement about the "gun cult" in America and how "easy availability of weapons contributes to violence."

Awards and nominations

Soundtrack and score
The music for the film was composed by Barry De Vorzon and Perry Botkin Jr. Their score included an instrumental selection titled "Cotton's Dream", which was later rescored to become the theme song of the soap opera The Young and the Restless, produced by Columbia's television division, now Sony Pictures Television. In late July or early August 1976, when ABC's sports summary program Wide World of Sports produced a montage of Romanian gymnast Nadia Comăneci's routines during the 1976 Summer Olympics and used "Cotton's Dream" as the background music, the song became more popular; it was subsequently released in a re-edited and lengthened form as "Nadia's Theme", the title under which it became best known. (Comăneci herself never performed her floor exercises using this piece of music, however.) De Vorzon and Botkin Jr. also wrote lyrics for "Cotton's Dream," but no vocal version of it was known to have charted . The film's soundtrack also contains its theme song, performed by The Carpenters. The theme was released as the B side of The Carpenters' single "Superstar", which reached #2 on Billboard's Hot 100.

See also
 List of American films of 1971

References

External links
 
 

1971 films
1970s coming-of-age comedy-drama films
American coming-of-age comedy-drama films
Columbia Pictures films
Films about summer camps
Films based on American novels
Films directed by Stanley Kramer
Films produced by Stanley Kramer
Films scored by Barry De Vorzon
Films scored by Perry Botkin Jr.
Films set in Arizona
1970s English-language films
1970s American films